Thomas Audley Bate (March 12, 1913 – September 21, 1967) was a Canadian politician. He served in the Legislative Assembly of British Columbia from 1953 to 1967, as a Social Credit member for the constituencies of Vancouver–Point Grey and Vancouver South. He died of a heart attack in 1967.

References

1913 births
1967 deaths
British Columbia Social Credit Party MLAs
People from the Comox Valley Regional District
Politicians from Vancouver